The Classen (Originally Citizens Bank Tower) is residential high-rise in the uptown section of Oklahoma City, near the city's Paseo Arts District and Asian District. The tower has 21 floors and is 287 feet tall. It is currently the third tallest residential building in the city.  It was listed on the National Register of Historic Places in 2010.

The building was finished in 1967 as the headquarters of the defunct Citizens National Bank. The tower was recently renovated and now consists of residential apartments for rent.

History
The Citizens Bank Tower is an architecturally significant building in Oklahoma City with its hexagonal plan, slender profile, unusual sunscreens and rigorously sculpted crown. It was among the first tall office buildings to be erected outside of downtown Oklahoma City, setting the standard for other distinctive large freestanding suburban skyscrapers. The Citizens Bank Tower was designed by Robert Roloff of Bozalis, who considered it a tribute to Frank Lloyd Wright and his Price Tower constructed in Bartlesville, Oklahoma. The interior of the tower has been adapted to apartment units for contemporary use.  Citizens Bank Tower has been listed on the National Register of Historic Places since March 8, 2010. The listing was announced as the featured listing in the National Park Service's weekly list of March 19, 2010.

Architecture
The Classen is modeled under the modern school of construction and has an exposed concrete narrow base.

See also
Price Tower
List of tallest buildings in Oklahoma City
National Register of Historic Places listings in Oklahoma County, Oklahoma

References

Residential skyscrapers in Oklahoma City
National Register of Historic Places in Oklahoma City
Bank buildings on the National Register of Historic Places in Oklahoma
Skyscraper office buildings in Oklahoma City
Commercial buildings completed in 1966
1967 establishments in Oklahoma